Leccinellum albellum is a species of bolete fungus in the family Boletaceae. Originally described by Charles Horton Peck as a species of Boletus, and, after 1945, usually considered a species of Leccinum, it was transferred to the newly created genus Leccinellum in 2003. The bolete was reported from a Mexican beech (Fagus mexicana) forest in Hidalgo, Mexico in 2010.

See also
List of Leccinum species
List of North American boletes

References

External links

Leccinellum
Fungi described in 1888
Fungi of North America
Taxa named by Charles Horton Peck